The crown is the state in all its aspects within the jurisprudence of the Commonwealth realms and their subdivisions (such as the Crown Dependencies, overseas territories, provinces, or states). The term can be used to refer to the office of the monarch or the monarchy as institutions, as opposed to the monarch as a private individual; to the rule of law; or to the functions of executive (the crown-in-council), legislative (the crown-in-parliament), and judicial (the crown on the bench) governance and the civil service.

The concept of the crown as a corporation sole developed first in England as a separation of the physical crown and property of the kingdom from the person and personal property of the monarch. It spread through English and later British colonisation and is now rooted in the legal lexicon of all 15 Commonwealth realms, their various dependencies, and states in free association with them. It is not to be confused with any physical crown, such as those of the British regalia.

The term is also found in various expressions such as crown land, which some countries refer to as public land or state land; as well as in some offices, such as minister of the crown, crown attorney, and crown prosecutor.

Definition
The term the crown does not have a single definition. Legal scholars Maurice Sunkin and Sebastian Payne opined, "the nature of the crown has been taken for granted, in part because it is fundamental and, in part, because many academics have no idea what the term the crown amounts to". Nicholas Browne-Wilkinson theorised that the crown is "an amorphous, abstract concept" and, thus, "impossible to define", while William Wade stated the crown "means simply the Queen". The Lord Simon of Glaisdale stated, "the crown is a piece of bejewelled headgear under guard at the Tower of London; but, one that symbolises the powers of government, which were formerly wielded by the wearer of the crown". The Lord Diplock suggested the crown means "the government [and] all of the ministers and parliamentary secretaries under whose direction the administrative work of the government is carried out by the civil servants employed in the various government departments." This interpretation was supported by Section 8 of the Pensions (Colonial Service) Act 1887, which set the terms "permanent civil service of the state", "permanent civil service of Her Majesty" and "permanent civil service of the Crown" as having the same meaning.

Concept

The concept of the crown took form under the feudal system. Though not used this way in all countries that had this system, in England, all rights and privileges were ultimately bestowed by the ruler. Land, for instance, was granted by the Crown to lords in exchange for feudal services and they, in turn, granted the land to lesser lords. One exception to this was common socage: owners of land held as socage held it subject only to the crown. When such lands become ownerless, they are said to escheat; i.e. return to direct ownership of the crown (crown lands).  is the royal prerogative by which unowned property, primarily unclaimed inheritances, becomes the property of the crown.

As such, the physical crown and the property belonging to successive monarchs in perpetuity came to be separated from the person of the monarch and his or her personal property. After several centuries of the monarch personally exercising supreme legislative, executive, and judicial power, these functions decreased as parliaments, ministries, and courts grew through the 13th century. The term the crown then developed into a means by which to differentiate the sovereign's official functions from his personal choices and actions.

When the kingdom of England merged with those of Scotland and
Ireland, the concept extended into the legal lexicons of the United
Kingdom and its dependencies and overseas territories and, eventually, all of the independent Commonwealth realms. There are, thus, now many distinct crowns, as a legal concept, "worn by"—or many different offices of monarch occupied by—one person as sovereign of each country. However, the Crown can also mean the international institution shared by all 15 Commonwealth realms.

Given that, in each realm, and at its broadest, the crown now means the government or the polity known as the state and the monarch, in all realms, is the living embodiment of the crown, the sovereign is regarded as the personification of the state. The body of the reigning sovereign thus holds two distinct personas in constant coexistence: that of a natural-born human being and that of the state as accorded to him or her through law. The crown and the monarch are "conceptually divisible but legally indivisible [...] The office cannot exist without the office-holder". The terms the state, the Crown, the Crown in Right of [jurisdiction], His Majesty the King in Right of [jurisdiction], and similar, are all synonymous and the monarch's legal personality is sometimes referred to simply as the relevant jurisdiction's name. (In countries using systems of government derived from Roman civil law, the state is the equivalent concept to the crown.) However, the terms the sovereign or monarch and the crown, though related, have different meanings: The crown includes both the monarch and the government. The institution and powers of the crown are vested in the king, but, generally, its functions are exercised in the sovereign's name by ministers of the crown drawn from and responsible to the elected chamber of parliament.

Still, the king or queen is the employer of all government officials and staff (including the viceroys, judges, members of the armed forces, police officers, and parliamentarians), the guardian of foster children (crown wards), as well as the owner of all state lands (crown land), buildings and equipment (crown-held property), state-owned companies (crown corporations), and the copyright for government publications (crown copyright). This is all in his or her position as sovereign, not as an individual; all such property is held by the crown in perpetuity and cannot be sold by the sovereign without the proper advice and consent of his or her relevant ministers.

The crown also represents the legal embodiment of executive, legislative, and judicial governance. While the crown's legal personality is usually regarded as a corporation sole, it can, at least for some purposes, be described as a corporation aggregate headed by the monarch. Frederic William Maitland argued the crown in the UK is a corporation aggregate embracing the government and the "whole political community". J.G. Allen preferred to view the crown as a corporation sole; one office occupied by a single person, enduring "through generations of incumbents and, historically, lends coherence to a network of other institutions of a similar nature." Canadian academic Philippe Lagassé found the crown "acts in various capacities, as such: crown-in-council (executive); crown-in-parliament (legislative); crown-in-court (judicial). It is also an artificial person and office as a corporation sole. At its most basic, 'the crown' is in the UK what is most other countries is 'the state'."

Divisibility of the crown

Historically, the crown was considered to be indivisible. Two judgments—Ex parte Indian Association of Alberta (EWCA, 1982) and Ex parte Quark (House of Lords, 2005)—challenged that view. Today, the crown is considered separate in every country, province, state, or territory, regardless of its degree of independence, that has the shared monarch as part of the respective country's government; though, limitations on the power of the monarch in right of each territory vary according to relevant laws, thus making the difference between full sovereignty, semi-sovereignty, dependency, etc. The Lords of Appeal wrote, "the Queen is as much the Queen of New South Wales and Mauritius and other territories acknowledging her as head of state as she is of England and Wales, Scotland, Northern Ireland, or the United Kingdom."

The crown in each of the Commonwealth realms is a similar, but separate, legal concept. To distinguish the institution's role in one jurisdiction from its place in another, Commonwealth law employs the expression the Crown in Right of [place]; for example, the Crown in Right of the United Kingdom, the Crown in Right of Canada, the Crown in Right of the Commonwealth of Australia, etc. Because both Canada and Australia are federations, there are also crowns in right of each Canadian province and each Australian state.

The powers of a realm's crown are exercised either by the monarch, personally, or by his or her representative on the advice of the appropriate local ministers, legislature, or judges, none of which may advise the crown in any other realm.

New Zealand
In New Zealand, the term the Crown is used to mostly mean the authority of government; its meaning changes in different contexts. In the context of people considering Treaty of Waitangi claims, professor of history Alan Ward defines the Crown as "the people of New Zealand—including Māori themselves—acted through elected parliament and government."

Crown Dependencies
In the Bailiwick of Guernsey, legislation refers to the Crown in Right of the Bailiwick of Guernsey or the Crown in Right of the Bailiwick and the law officers of the Crown of Guernsey submitted that, "the Crown in this context ordinarily means the Crown in right of the république of the Bailiwick of Guernsey" and that this comprises "the collective governmental and civic institutions, established by and under the authority of the monarch, for the governance of these islands, including the states of Guernsey and legislatures in the other islands, the royal court and other courts, the lieutenant governor, parish authorities, and the Crown acting in and through the Privy Council".

In the Bailiwick of Jersey, statements by the law officers of the Crown define the Crown's operation in that jurisdiction as the Crown in Right of Jersey, with all Crown land in the Bailiwick of Jersey belonging to the Crown in Right of Jersey and not to the Crown Estate of the United Kingdom. The Succession to the Crown (Jersey) Law 2013 defined the Crown, for the purposes of implementing the Perth Agreement in Jersey law, as the Crown in Right of the Bailiwick of Jersey.

Legislation in the Isle of Man also defines the Crown in Right of the Isle of Man as being separate from the Crown in Right of the United Kingdom.

British Overseas Territories
Following the Lords' decision in Ex parte Quark, 2005, it is held that the King, in exercising his authority over British Overseas Territories, does not act on the advice of the Cabinet of the United Kingdom, but, in his role as king of each territory, with the exception of fulfilling the UK's international responsibilities for its territories. To comply with the court's decision, the territorial governors now act on the advice of each territory's executive and the UK government can no longer disallow legislation passed by territorial legislatures.

In the courts

In criminal proceedings, the state is the prosecuting party; the case is usually designated as R v [defendant], where R can stand for either rex (if the current monarch is male) or regina (if the monarch is female). For example, a criminal case against Smith might be referred to as R v Smith and verbally read as "the crown against Smith".

The crown is, in general, immune to prosecution and civil lawsuits. So, R is rarely (albeit sometimes) seen on the right hand side of the 'v' in the first instance. To pursue a case against alleged unlawful activity by the government, a case in judicial review is brought by the crown against a minister on the application of a claimant. The titles of these cases now follow the pattern of R (on the application of [X]) v [Y]", notated as R ([X]) v [Y], for short. Thus, R (Miller) v Secretary of State for Exiting the European Union is R (on the application of Miller and other) v Secretary of State for Exiting the European Union, where "Miller" is Gina Miller, a citizen. Until the end of the 20th century, such case titles used the pattern R v Secretary of State for Exiting the European Union, ex parte Miller. Either form may be abbreviated R (Miller) v Secretary of State for Exiting the European Union.

In Scotland, criminal prosecutions are undertaken by the lord advocate (or the relevant procurator fiscal) in the name of the Crown. Accordingly, the abbreviation HMA is used in the High Court of Justiciary for His/Her Majesty's Advocate, in place of rex or regina; as in, HMA v Al Megrahi and Fahima.

Most jurisdictions in Australia use R or the king (or the queen) in criminal cases. If the Crown is the respondent to an appeal, the words the king will be spelled out, instead of using the abbreviation R (i.e. the case name at trial would be R v Smith; if the defendant appeals against the Crown, the case name would be Smith v the King). In Western Australia and Tasmania, prosecutions will be brought in the name of the respective state instead of the Crown (e.g. the State of Western Australia v Smith). Victorian trials in the original jurisdiction will be brought in the name of the director of public prosecutions. The Commonwealth director of public prosecutions may choose which name to bring the proceeding in. Judges usually refer to the prosecuting party as simply "the prosecution" in the text of judgments. In civil cases where the Crown is a party, it is a customary to list the body politic (e.g. State of Queensland or Commonwealth of Australia) or the appropriate government minister as the party, instead. When a case is announced in court, the clerk or bailiff may refer to the Crown orally as our sovereign lord the king (or our sovereign lady the queen).

In reporting on court proceedings in New Zealand, news reports will refer to the prosecuting lawyer (often called a Crown prosecutor, as in Canada and the United Kingdom) as representing the Crown; usages such as, "for the Crown, Joe Bloggs argued," being common.

The crown can also be a plaintiff or defendant in civil actions to which the government of the Commonwealth realm in question is a party. Such crown proceedings are often subject to specific rules and limitations, such as the enforcement of judgments against the crown. Qui tam lawsuits on behalf of the crown were once common, but have been unusual since the Common Informers Act 1951 ended the practice of allowing such suits by common informers.

 Crown forces 
The term crown forces has been applied by militant Irish republicans to British-authorised security forces on the island of Ireland, including the British Armed Forces and armed police such as the Royal Ulster Constabulary, which are seen as enemy combatants or an occupation force. Irish nationalists may apply crown forces'' to earlier forces raised by the Dublin Castle administration at intervals since the Tudor conquest of Ireland to suppress various Irish uprisings.

See also

 Crown Court

Further reading

Notes

References

British Overseas Territories
Commonwealth of Nations
Commonwealth realms
Common law
Monarchy
Legal fictions